Guy Joron (June 2, 1940 – December 28, 2017) was a politician in Quebec, Canada.

Background
He was born on June 2, 1940 in Montreal. He had a B.A. in political science from Université de Montréal.

Member of the legislature
Joron successfully ran as a Parti Québécois candidate to the National Assembly of Quebec in the district of Gouin in 1970, defeating Liberal incumbent Yves Michaud.  He was defeated in 1973.

He was returned to the legislature in 1976, representing the district of Mille-Îles.

Alongside caucus colleague Claude Charron, he was one of the first two known gay members of the National Assembly. Neither man was out to the general public during his time in politics, although both were out among their colleagues in the assembly.

Cabinet Member
In 1976, Joron was appointed to Premier René Lévesque's Cabinet. He served as Minister responsible for Energy until 1979 and Minister of Cooperatives and Financial Institutions from 1979 to 1980. Joron resigned his seat and retired from politics in 1981.

Footnotes

1940 births
2017 deaths
French Quebecers
Canadian LGBT people in provincial and territorial legislatures
Gay politicians
Parti Québécois MNAs
Politicians from Montreal
Université de Montréal alumni
Canadian gay men